Vachak Ab (also Romanized as Vachak Āb) is a village in Cham Kabud Rural District, Sarab Bagh District, Abdanan County, Ilam Province, Iran. At the 2006 census, its population was 552, in 103 families. The village is populated by both Kurds and Lurs.

Smoking is forbidden in the village.

References 

Populated places in Abdanan County
Kurdish settlements in Ilam Province
Luri settlements in Ilam Province